Alan Clarke (1920–1969) was a BBC Radio sports commentator from 1947 to 1969, who covered every major football event alongside Raymond Glendenning, Maurice Edelston, Brian Moore and Peter Jones. He was at the microphone as Geoff Hurst scored England's 4th in the 1966 FIFA World Cup Final. He died in May 1969 at the age of 49. His last broadcast was the second leg of the European Cup semi-final between Manchester United and A.C. Milan earlier in the month. He commentated on other sports including motor racing and also hosted music programmes for the Corporation throughout his career, and for some time he was head of sport for the BBC in the North of England.

1920 births
1969 deaths
BBC sports presenters and reporters
British association football commentators